On November 8, 1988, the District of Columbia held an election for its non-voting House delegate representing the District of Columbia's at-large congressional district. The winner of the race was Walter E. Fauntroy (D), who won his ninth re-election. All elected members would serve in 101st United States Congress.

The delegate is elected for two-year terms.

Candidates
Walter E. Fauntroy, a Democrat, sought re-election for his tenth and final term to the United States House of Representatives. Fauntroy was opposed in this election by Republican challenger Ron Evans and D.C. Statehood Party candidate Alvin C. Frost, who received 13.42% and 8.07%, respectively.  Independent candidate David H. Dabney also participated and received 6.11%.  This resulted in Fauntroy being elected with 71.27% of the vote.

Results

See also
 United States House of Representatives elections in the District of Columbia

References

District of Columbia
1988
United States House